The 2012 Portuguese Social Democratic Party leadership election was held on 3 March 2012. Then PSD leader and Prime Minister Pedro Passos Coelho ran for a 2nd term as party leader and was the sole candidate in the race, thus winning with almost 95% of the votes.

Candidates

Withdrew
 Nuno Miguel Henriques;

Results

See also
 Social Democratic Party (Portugal)
 List of political parties in Portugal
 Elections in Portugal

References

External links
PSD Official Website

2012 in Portugal
Political party leadership elections in Portugal
2012 elections in Portugal
Portuguese Social Democratic Party leadership election